The  was an army of the Imperial Japanese Army during the Second Sino-Japanese War and World War II.

History
The Japanese 13th Army was formed on September 23, 1939, under the control of the China Expeditionary Army. It was based in Shanghai and surrounding provinces primarily a garrison force to maintain public order and to engage in counter-insurgency operations in conjunction with the collaborationist forces of the Reformed Government of the Republic of China, and later with its successor, the Wang Jingwei Government. It was later tasked with deterring possible landings of the Allies in the lower Yangtze River area of east central China. It surrendered to the Chinese Kuomintang forces on August 15, 1945, at the surrender of Japan and was disbanded in Shanghai.

List of commanders

Commanding officer

Chief of Staff

Subordinate units

1941 China Expeditionary Army

 15th Infantry Division
 17th Infantry Division
 22nd Infantry Division
 116th Infantry Division

1945: 13th Army of the China Expeditionary Army
 60th Infantry Division
 61st Infantry Division
 65th Infantry Division
 69th Infantry Division
 118th Infantry Division
 161st Infantry Division
 90th Independent Mixed Brigade (Imperial Japanese Army)
 92nd Independent Mixed Brigade (Imperial Japanese Army)
 6th Independent Infantry Brigade

References

External links

13
Military units and formations established in 1939
Military units and formations disestablished in 1945